Tempeh or tempe is a traditional Indonesian food made from fermented soybeans. It is made by a natural culturing and controlled fermentation process that binds soybeans into a cake form. A fungus, Rhizopus oligosporus or Rhizopus oryzae, is used in the fermentation process and is also known as tempeh starter. 

It is especially popular on the island of Java, where it is a staple source of protein. Like tofu, tempeh is made from soybeans, but it is a whole-soybean product with different nutritional characteristics and textural qualities. Tempeh's fermentation process and its retention of the whole bean give it a higher content of protein, dietary fiber, and vitamins. It has a firm texture and an earthy flavor, which becomes more pronounced as it ages.

Etymology
The term tempe is thought to be derived from the Old Javanese , a whitish food made of fried batter made from sago or rice flour which resembles rempeyek. The historian Denys Lombard also suggests that it could be linked to a later term  or tapai which means 'fermentation'.

In the western world, tempeh is the most common spelling. This is done to prevent readers from incorrectly pronouncing the word as "temp". The first known usage of this spelling is in an 1896 German article. Other spellings, such as témpé, were also used, but tempeh has become the standard spelling in English since the 1960s.

History

Tempeh originated in Indonesia, almost certainly in central or east Java with an estimated discovery between a few centuries ago to a thousand years or more.

The invention of tempeh cannot be separated from the origin of the fungus, which is the important part of the fermentation. This fungus consists of a mycelium that grows on teakwood and sea hibiscus leaves, which native Javanese people often used (and still do) as food wrappings.

The type of soybean first used to make tempeh was the black soybean, which was a native plant. This later changed with the importation of white/yellow soybeans and the rise of the tofu industry on the island.

Debate over origins

Murdijati Gardjito, a food historian at Gadjah Mada University, argued that tempeh was made by native Javanese people, and that its preparation predates the introduction of Chinese-style tofu products. Some ancient texts mention , old Javanese for 'native soybean tempeh';  was used to refer to the native soybean variety. White soybeans that are used to make most  today used to be called  ('white soybeans'), and were only available in Java centuries later. Mary Astuti, a food historian at Gadjah Mada University specializing in tempeh, argued that the native variety of soybean had been grown before the Chinese arrived in the region.

Sri Tandjung noted that Javanese had been eating cooked (native black) soybeans since the 12th century. By the 16th or the 19th century, depending on which period of time the writer of Serat Centhini referred to, Javanese people had mastered the art of cooking with tempeh, where it was not only eaten as is, but converted into different types of dishes, showing a full understanding and mastery of the food product.

Gardjito noted that Javanese noble families rarely wrote about tempeh in ancient texts because it had never been a part of royal cuisine, but rather a staple meal of the lower classes.

He argued that the two food products are made of the same ingredient and that genetically speaking, soybeans are from China, though the specific variety was never mentioned. Food journalist Andreas Maryoto supported this idea, saying that tempeh might have been accidentally produced as the by-product of the tofu industry in Java in the 17th century, as discarded soybeans caught the spores of a whitish fungus that was found to be edible.

However,  was (and is still) made of white soybeans (Glycine max, native to Japan and China), as opposed to the earliest version of  that was made of native black soybeans (Glycine soja).

 (tofu) made its way to Kediri in the 13th century and was consumed by Mongolians who arrived in Java. Later, it was popular only among the rich (the complex production process and imported white soybeans led to its high price). Around the 17th or 19th century,  became available to everyone.

Tempeh later began to be made with white soybeans, leading to the decreased use of its native black variety. Black soybeans have been replaced by other commodity plants since. The original version of  has been forgotten as  has since become the common people's food, and dependence on imported white soybeans grows.

Production

Tempeh begins with whole soybeans, which are softened by soaking, and dehulled, then partly cooked. Specialty tempeh may be made from other types of beans, wheat, or may include a mixture of beans and whole grains. Adding vinegar during soybeans soaking process had also been reported in tempeh industries and it had been found to influence the sensory nature of the final product.

The principal step in making tempeh is the fermentation of soybeans which undergo inoculation with Rhizopus spp. molds, a type of filamentous fungus most widely used for the production of tempeh. A fermentation starter containing the spores of fungus Rhizopus oligosporus or Rhizopus oryzae is mixed in. The beans are spread into a thin layer and are allowed to ferment for 24 to 36 hours at a temperature around 30°C (86°F). The soybeans have to cool down to allow spore germination and abundant growth of mycelium. Later, the temperature of the beans will naturally rise and rapid mold growth happens for around 4 hours. As mold growth declines, the soybeans should be bound into a solid mass by the mycelium. In good tempeh, the beans are knitted together by a mat of white mycelium. Typically, tempeh is harvested after 48 hours of fermentation with its distinguishable whitish color, firm texture, and nutty flavor. Extended fermentation time results in an increase in pH and undesirable color darkening in the tempeh.

During the fermentation process, optimal time of fermentation, temperature, oxygen, humidity, and pH levels are required to encourage the growth of the Rhizopus mold, while discouraging the growth of undesired microorganisms. The pH level should be kept around 3-5 by adding a mild acidulant such as vinegar, lactic acid, or acetic acid, thereby favoring mold growth and restricting the growth of spoilage microorganisms. Oxygen is required for Rhizopus spp. growth, but should be maintained at low levels to prevent the production of undesired microorganisms. Under conditions of lower temperature, or higher ventilation, gray or black patches of spores may form on the surface—this is not harmful, and should not affect the flavor or quality of the tempeh.  This sporulation is normal on fully mature tempeh. A mild ammonia smell may accompany good tempeh as it ferments, but it should not be overpowering.

Traditional tempeh is often produced in Indonesia using Hibiscus tiliaceus leaves. The undersides of the leaves are covered in downy hairs (known technically as trichomes) to which the mold Rhizopus oligosporus can be found adhering in the wild. Soybeans are pressed into the leaf, and stored. Fermentation occurs resulting in tempeh. In particular, the tempeh undergoes salt-free aerobic fermentation.

Tempeh made with traditional inoculation methods are also more likely to include molds of other species including Rhizopus arrhizus and Rhizopus delemar which may outcompete Rhizopus oligosporus and become dominant. This resulted in white wooly appearance and more pleasant aroma compared with tempeh made with commercial starter containing only Rhizopus oligosporus. Famously these variant tempeh are found in Malang and Purwokerto in the 1960s, because Malang is located in a cool plateau, and tempeh made with Rhizopus oligosporus resulted in less compact and more alcoholic-smelling tempeh, while Rhizopus arrhizus required lower optimum temperature which made it more ideal and dominant. However the widespread use of commercial starter resulted in most tempeh in Java only contains Rhizopus oligosporus, with few traditionally made tempeh outside Java still contains Rhizopus arrhizus and Rhizopus delemar.

Dry matter losses and yield 
During the processing of soybeans to make tempeh there are inevitable losses of material due to the removal of the hulls and the leaching of soluble compounds during the soaking, washing and cooking stages. Hulls constitute about 8% of the dry beans and losses due to the leaching of soluble compounds equate to 12 - 17% of the dry beans. The oligosaccharides, stachyose, raffinose and sucrose, can constitute up to 50% of the soluble materials lost. During the fermentation there is some further loss of material due to respiration by the mold and the oxidation of compounds to carbon dioxide and water. Reported losses of dry matter during the fermentation range from 2.1 to 10%. Hence, the overall yield of tempeh is in the range of 72-78 g tempeh per 100 g soybeans on a dry matter basis. In practical terms, this means that 100 g dry soybeans (7-9% moisture content) will yield about 170 to 210 g fresh tempeh (61-64% moisture content).

Determining quality 
Once tempeh is produced, it is divided into three categories based on its quality: good, unfinished, and inedible. Good tempeh includes beans that are bound into a firm, compact cake by a dense, uniform, white mycelium, which should permeate the entire cake; the beans should be barely visible. The odor of good tempeh should be pleasant, clean, subtly sweet or resemble the aroma of mushrooms. The entire tempeh should lift as a single, cohesive cake without crumbling when shaken gently. Unfinished tempeh has beans that are bound together loosely by a sparse white mycelium, hence it crumbles easily. Unfinished tempeh should be incubated longer unless it has been incubated more than eight hours past the recommended time. If it has been incubated for enough time and still remains unfinished, it should be discarded. Inedible tempeh has beans with foul odor, resembling strong ammonia or alcohol, indicating the development of undesirable bacteria due to excess moisture or overheating. Inedible tempeh cake is wet, slimy, and mushy with a collapsed structure. Its color is tan to brown and mold develops in sparse patches.

Packaging 

Food grade wrapping paper and perforated polyethylene bags are the most suitable materials for packaging tempeh. They have demonstrated good retention of the quality of tempeh and extension of the shelf life of tempeh for three days compared to fresh tempeh. Appropriate packaging is important as it provides optimum oxygen supply and temperature for inoculation and fermentation to occur during processing. Tempeh is a perishable food and must be wrapped and placed into the refrigerator or freezer immediately after incubation or other processing steps such as blanching. In the refrigerator or freezer, stacking of tempeh should be minimized to prevent overheating and the undesirable, gradual continuation of fermentation, both of which shorten the storage life of tempeh. Even under cold temperature, tempeh continues to respire and undergo slow decomposition from microorganisms and its natural enzymes. Therefore, tempeh should be well cooled for at least two to five hours in a cooler before they undergo further packaging. Tempeh packaged in perforated polyethylene bags is usually repacked inside another labeled, non-perforated bag for distribution and sale, and for easier labeling. If the tempeh is only packaged in one perforated bag, the label must be directly attached to the perforated surface with the use of government food contact approved adhesive. They are then bulk packed in cartons and returned to the refrigerator or freezer to await shipment.

Nutrition

Tempeh is 60% water, 20% protein, 8% carbohydrates, and 11% fats (table).

Effects of fermentation
The soy carbohydrates in tempeh become more digestible as a result of the fermentation process. In particular, the oligosaccharides associated with gas and indigestion are greatly reduced by the Rhizopus culture. In traditional tempeh-making shops, the starter culture often contains beneficial bacteria that produce vitamins such as B12 (though it is uncertain whether this B12 is always present and bioavailable). In western countries, it is more common to use a pure culture containing only Rhizopus oligosporus, which makes little B12 and could be missing Citrobacter freundii and Klebsiella pneumoniae, which have been shown to produce significant levels of B12 analogs in tempeh when present. Whether these analogs are true, bioavailable B12 has not been thoroughly studied yet. The fermentation process also reduces the phytic acid in soy, which in turn allows the body to absorb the minerals that soy provides.

Preparation

In the kitchen, tempeh is often simply prepared by cutting it into pieces, soaking in brine or a salty sauce, and then fried. In Java, tempeh is often traditionally prepared by cutting it into pieces, marinated in a mixture of ground garlic, coriander and turmeric, salt and water; then deep fried, and often served with sambal ulek chili paste. Cooked tempeh can be eaten alone, or used in chili, stir fries, soups, salads, sandwiches, and stews. Tempeh's complex flavor has been described as nutty, meaty, and mushroom-like. It freezes well, and is now commonly available in many western supermarkets, as well as in ethnic markets and health food stores. Tempeh can be steamed, marinated, thinly sliced, blackened, or crumbled into sauces and stews.

Tempeh performs well in a cheese grater, after which it may be used in place of ground beef (as in tacos). When thin-sliced and deep-fried in oil, tempeh obtains a crisp golden crust while maintaining a soft interior. Its sponge-like consistency makes it suitable for marinating. Dried tempeh (whether cooked or raw) is more portable and less perishable and may be used as a stew base. Sometimes when tempeh is diced and left, it will create white feathery fluff which bonds the cut—this is the Rhizopus mold still growing—this is normal and perfectly edible.

Types

A related product to tempeh is oncom, which is made from peanut press cake or soy dregs and is prevalent in Sundanese culture in West Java. There are two types of oncom: a bright red-orange kind with Neurospora sitophila, and a black one with the same fungi as tempeh uses.

Tempeh can also be differentiated according to its degrees of maturity (i.e. the mycelium's growth/age).  is a tempeh that is not fully fermented, that is, the mycelium has not fully covered the surface. The taste of the beans is more solid and profound. 'rotten tempeh'), when the mycelium has acquired a blackened coloration and the product has a putrid smell.

Some types of tempeh are made of ingredients that would be otherwise wasted if not used. According to traditional Javanese customs, wasting food is deemed as a sign of disrespect to Nature and other beings, and encourages efforts to use every part of an ingredient.

The wrappings used in tempeh making can contribute to its flavor and aroma. Though some prefer the traditional banana,  or teak leaf, readily available plastic sheet wrappings have been increasingly widely used.

Soft and fluffy tempeh made from soy pulp or tofu dregs.  usually can be found in traditional markets of Java, at a price lower than that of common soybean tempeh.

In Indonesia, ripe tempeh (two or more days old) is considered a delicacy. Having a slightly pungent aroma, small amounts are used as a flavoring agent in traditional Javanese sayur lodeh vegetable stew and sambal tumpang.

In Javanese, the term  means 'leaf'.

Pure soybean cake, tempeh made in plastic wrap without any fillings or additives such as grated raw papaya. This was meant to create a more "hygienic and pure" tempeh free from any impurities or unwanted microbes.

A specialty of Malang, the rough-textured  is made from black soybeans mixed with other ingredients, such as peanut dregs, cassava fiber, and soybean meal. The process of making  is quite similar to black oncom.

is a variety of tempeh from Central Java, notably Banyumas. It is prepared with coconut dregs. This type of tempeh has led to several cases of fatal food poisoning, as it occasionally gets contaminated with the bacterium Burkholderia gladioli, and the unwanted organism produces toxins (bongkrek acid and toxoflavin) from the coconut, besides killing off the Rhizopus fungus due to the antibiotic activity of  acid.

Fatalities from contaminated  were once common in the area where it was produced. Thus, its sale is now prohibited by law; clandestine manufacture continues, however, due to the popular flavor. The problem of contamination is not encountered with bean and grain tempeh, which have a different composition of fatty acids that is not favorable for the growth of B. gladioli, but encourages growth of Rhizopus instead. When bean or grain tempeh has the proper color, texture and smell, it is a very strong indication the product is safe. Yellow  is always highly toxic due to toxoflavin, but  with a normal coloration may still contain lethal amounts of  acid.

Oat tempeh
A form of tempeh based on barley and oats instead of soy was developed by scientists at the Swedish Department of Food Science in 2008. It can be produced in climatic regions where it is not possible to grow soybeans.

Cooking methods and recipes 

The simplest way to cook tempeh is by frying. It is both deep-fried and stir-fried. However, there are several cooking methods and recipe variations. Among others are:

Perhaps the simplest and most popular way to prepare tempeh in Indonesia. The tempeh is sliced and seasoned in a mixture of ground garlic, coriander seeds and salt, and then deep fried in palm oil. The tempeh might be coated in batter prior to frying, or directly fried without any batter.

is a traditional Javanese dish originating in Central Java.  is a Javanese cooking method of braising in spices and palm sugar and boiling the food in a closed place until the water runs out. The tempeh is first braised in a mixture of coconut water, palm sugar, and spices including coriander seeds, shallots, galangal, and bay leaves, and then briefly deep-fried. The result is a moist, sweet and spicy, dark-colored tempeh. Tofu may also be used, yielding .

This variation is often found in Purwokerto. The word  originates in the Banyumas regional dialect, and means 'flash-fried'. The tempeh is first dipped in spiced flour before quickly frying in very hot oil, resulting in a product that is cooked on the outside, but raw or only partially so on the inside. It has a limp, soft texture compared to the more common, crisp, fully fried tempeh.

It is a crispy, sweet and spicy, fried tempeh. The raw tempeh is cut into small sticks and thoroughly deep-fried until no longer moist, and then mixed with palm sugar, chili pepper or other spices, or with sweet soy sauce. Often it is mixed with separately fried peanuts and anchovies. This dry tempeh will keep for up to a month if cooked and stored properly.

or 
The sweet taste is due to generous addition of kecap manis (sweet soy sauce).

or 
Stir-fried tempeh with vegetables such as green bean, basil, or onion, with spices. Other recipes might add coconut milk for a milky-colored, and rather moist, stir-fried tempeh.

Fried tempeh mixed with sambal chili paste in a mortar and pestle. Usually served in addition to other  dishes, such as ayam penyet (chicken) or iga penyet (ribs).

Tempeh skewered and grilled as satay.

 (Javanese for 'poor man's satay') from Solo in Central Java is made from fluffy .

Kripik  snack crackers; a thinly sliced tempeh, battered and deep fried until crispy. It is popular across Java, but notably produced in Bandung, West Java and Malang, East Java.

Grilled tempeh
Grilled tempeh over charcoal or fire.

Tempeh sandwich or tempeh burger
Fried, grilled or otherwise cooked tempeh patties, sandwiched between slices of bread or hamburger buns with salad, sauces or seasonings.

Preservation

Freshly made, raw tempeh remains edible for a few days at room temperature. It is neither acidic nor does it contain significant amounts of alcohol. It, however, does possess stronger resistance to lipid peroxidation than unfermented soybeans due to its antioxidant contents.

The deep-frying process removes the moisture, preventing further fermentation and deterioration, thus prolonging its shelf life.

Antimicrobial agents 
Rhizopus cultures responsible for the fermentation of tempeh from soybean produce natural, heat-stable antimicrobial agents against spoilage and disease-causing microorganisms, extending the shelf life of the fermented product through microbial antagonism. The mold is capable of inhibiting the growth of other fungi such as Aspergiluus flavus and Aspergillus parasiticus by interfering with the accumulation of aflatoxin (especially aflatoxin B1), the mycotoxin of greatest concern. R. oligosporus has also been reported to produce four to five antibacterial substances during fermentation process. It produces phenolic compounds against pathogenic bacteria such as Helicobacter pylori and an antibacterial protein has been identified with activities against Bacillus species (especially against Bacillus subtilis and Bacillus cereus), Staphylococcus aureus, and Steptococcus cremoris.

Non-refrigerated fresh tempeh 
Tempeh can be sold and consumed fresh within 48 hours once removed from its incubator. It is commonly transported to the market in its incubation container (e.g. polyethylene bag, banana leaf wrapper, etc.) and placed in the shade. In areas with warmer climates, tempeh can be kept at room temperature for one to three days before it becomes overripe. In locations with more temperate temperatures, it can keep for one to four days but will usually need to be refrigerated to prevent spoilage.

Refrigeration 
Fresh refrigerated tempeh should be sealed in a labeled polyethylene bag and kept in temperatures below . It can be kept at this temperature for three to five days and sometimes, even as long as a week. Storage life could be extended to two or three weeks if the tempeh is blanched or steamed prior to refrigeration due to the inactivation of enzymes and destruction of bacteria.

Freezing 
Freezing is the preferred way to preserve tempeh due to its capability for wide distribution. Tempeh can be frozen whole or in slices, depending on preference. During the freezing process, whole tempeh is placed in its perforated wrapper whereas sliced tempeh is packaged in a labelled polyethylene bag prior to being sealed in an outer bag and then frozen immediately. This method will keep for months with only a small loss of texture and flavor.

Blanching 
Blanching tempeh by steaming or parboiling helps to extend the storage life by preventing bacterial growth, stopping mold growth and inactivating enzymes. Steaming appears to have a less negative effect than parboiling in terms of texture, flavor and nutritional value. Blanching is a great method for preserving tempeh prior to refrigeration, though not as beneficial for tempeh that is to be frozen.

Dehydration

Air tray drying 
Tempeh can be dried via the air tray drying method. Cubes of tempeh placed on steel, mesh bottom trays are dried by the circulating hot air dryer. When placed in moisture proof Pliofilm bags, the tempeh has a shelf life of several months at room temperature. Although this is a convenient method that produces a shelf stable product without requirement of refrigeration, the process of hot air drying can cause a significant loss of nutritional content such as the soluble solids and nitrogen protein content.

Sun drying 
This preservation method is most economical out of all methods. The tempeh can be blanched prior to dehydration to preserve flavor and prolong shelf life. A disadvantage of this method is that sunlight can destroy some of the vitamin B12 of tempeh.

Freeze-drying 
This method is the most expensive out of all dehydration methods but provides the advantage of long stable shelf life at room temperature and an excellent retention of soluble nutrients (nitrogen protein and other solids). Due to the expensive nature of the equipment, the final product price is higher than tempeh preserved through other methods.

Spray-drying 
As this method is traditionally used for small particles, it is used to produce tempeh powder for products such as soups, breads, tortillas, etc. However, this method can be expensive due to the bulky nature of the equipment.

Deep-frying 
This method produces ready to eat tempeh products. The tempeh is deep-fried until golden brown and crisp, and then cooled quickly in a sterile environment to be sealed in Pliofilm bags and stored in a cool, dry place. The shelf life of this product lasts around a week but can be extended if the tempeh is sun dried or oven dried prior to deep frying.

See also

 List of fermented soy products
 List of meat substitutes
 List of soy-based foods
Miso
Nattō
Oncom
Tapai
 
 Veganism

References

Fermented soy-based foods
Soy-based foods
Meat substitutes
Vegetarian cuisine
Vegan cuisine
Javanese culture
Vegetarian dishes of Indonesia